Protocol on Mutual Legal Assistance in Criminal Matters (or Protocol of San Luis) is a MERCOSUR treaty signed by Argentina, Brazil, Paraguay and Uruguay adopted in San Luis province, Argentina, on 25 June 1996, with the goal of establishing a system of international criminal judicial cooperation among the States part of the treaty in criminal matters at the several levels of criminal cooperation excluding extradition, which has been regulated in the Agreement on Extradition between the States Parties of MERCOSUR of 1998.

References

External links 
 Text of the treaty

Mercosur
Mutual legal assistance treaties
Treaties of Argentina
Treaties of Brazil
Treaties of Paraguay
Treaties of Uruguay